Nemophora opalina is a moth of the family Adelidae first described by Edward Meyrick in 1912. It is found in the Australian states of New South Wales and Queensland.

Original description

External links
Australian Faunal Directory
Image at CSIRO Entomology

Moths of Australia
Moths described in 1912
Adelidae